Sanctum is a 2011 3D action-thriller film directed by Alister Grierson and written by John Garvin and Andrew Wight. It stars Richard Roxburgh, Rhys Wakefield, Alice Parkinson, Dan Wyllie, and Ioan Gruffudd. Wight also produced the film, with James Cameron as executive producer.

The film was released in the United States on 4 February 2011 by Universal Pictures to predominantly mixed reviews from critics and grossed $108 million on a $30 million budget. It also received an AACTA Award nomination for Best Visual Effects. Universal Studios Home Entertainment released Sanctum on DVD, Blu-ray Disc, and Blu-ray 3D on 7 June 2011.

Plot

Seventeen-year-old Joshua "Josh" McGuire (Rhys Wakefield), expedition bank-roller Carl Hurley (Ioan Gruffudd) and his girlfriend, Victoria "Vic" Elaine (Alice Parkinson), travel to the Esa'ala Cave, an underwater cave exploration site in Papua New Guinea. Josh's father, Frank (Richard Roxburgh), a master diver, has already established a forward base camp at a lower level inside the cave, where the team has been exploring for weeks. As Josh voices his disdain for his father and his opinions about cave exploration, the team below prepares to dive into an unexplored area of the system.

While exploring the entrance to the new system, Judes (Allison Cratchley) experiences a problem with her air tank hose. She loses use of her air mask forcing Frank to buddy breathe. After a few exchanges, Judes panics and tries to keep the mask on, but Frank forces the mask off of her knowing he will not have enough air otherwise to make it back to the team. As Judes drowns, Josh watches on a monitor at "forward camp" and presumes the worst of his father. In a struggle to determine who truly was responsible for her death, it is revealed by Frank that Judes had dived in an exhausted state since they previously had to retrieve the extra bailout tanks, a task Josh did not do. Meanwhile, their above-ground crew realises that a very big storm is preparing to hit their location sooner than anticipated. They attempt to warn the team below, but are unsuccessful. Josh expresses his desire to return to the surface and with communications down and an uncertain expedition in front of them, team leader Frank agrees to have his son return to the surface with a buddy climber ahead of them.

While Josh climbs back towards the surface with Luko, Liz, and J.D, water begins rushing in from their exit. The storm they were trying to avoid had turned into a cyclone, causing flash floods that begin to fill the cave. As J.D. and Liz make their way up through "the elevator" (an area leading up to the main entrance of the cave), Josh is unable to leave his father and the dive team behind to their doom and turns back, accompanied by Luko. As they are making their way back to "forward camp" they discover that Frank and the team have already evacuated their camp and are assisting Victoria as she climbs her way up and out of the cavern. Josh leaps in to help, strapping a rope around a nearby boulder and forming a belay for the team to escape. Unfortunately, the boulder begins to give way leaving Josh to hold Victoria's line and Luko to hold back the boulder. The water rushes through and forces Victoria and Josh to fall back down into the now flooded base camp. Luko is severely injured when the boulder breaks loose, sealing the shaft and throwing him back down into the cavern. He is swept into an underwater tunnel before the team can reach him.

The team decides to use the unexplored tunnel as an escape route from the rapidly flooding cavern. Victoria, panicked and anxious, refuses to wear Jude's old wetsuit and is given a quick tutorial on how to dive. Before the team can leave, a severely injured and mutilated Luko surfaces in the cavern. Seeing that his friend is in great pain and near death, Frank mercifully drowns him.
The team presses on and makes it through to the other side of the system. Without a wetsuit, Victoria suffers severely from the cold water. Meanwhile, George—an experienced, veteran diver—has become ill due to the dive and is dying unbeknownst to the rest of the team. After a short rest, the team continues through the system following the flow of water out towards the sea. George realises that he cannot continue and after sharing a few words with Josh relieves himself of his pack and hides himself so as not to burden the rest of the team.

As the team marches on they arrive at a seemingly dead end. A great hole in the bottom of the cave separates them from the other side of their path. Josh uses his climbing expertise to fish a line across and begins to transfer their gear and each other. As Victoria begins to make her way across she catches her hair in her rope gear; she loses her grip, leaving her hair as the only thing holding her weight. Using her knife, she attempts to cut away the hair, but severs her rope and falls to her death. At the sight of Victoria's death, Carl becomes emotionally unstable. In a fit of panic, he steals the last remaining rebreather and disappears into the tunnel. Josh and Frank, however, find another way out through a crevasse in the cavern. The tunnel leads them to a sunlit cavern where an unidentified WWII Japanese tank collapsed through the surface years ago. Unfortunately, the hole in the middle of the roof where the tank fell is the only opening and they are unable to climb out. They spend the rest of the day there and proceed back into the cave by night.

A little later they discover Carl whose state of mind has worsened considerably, having found Victoria's corpse. Carl attempts to murder Frank for Victoria's death but Josh separates the two and temporarily disables Carl. Frank, however, has been gravely injured having fallen on a stalagmite which punctured his back. When Carl wakes, the gravity of his actions is realised and he solemnly disappears into the tunnel. In immense pain, Frank requests that Josh drown him. Josh reluctantly does so, and swims into the tunnel.

A short distance in, he encounters Carl, who has already drowned looking for the exit. Just as he begins to lose hope, Josh discovers a way out through the cave to open ocean. He emerges from the water and crawls onto the beach, where he is discovered by fishermen.

Cast
 Richard Roxburgh as Frank McGuire
 Ioan Gruffudd as Carl Hurley
 Rhys Wakefield as Joshua "Josh" McGuire
 Alice Parkinson as Victoria "Vic" Elaine
 Dan Wyllie as George
 Christopher James Baker as J.D.
 Nicole Downs as Liz
 Allison Cratchley as Judes
 Cramer Cain as Luko
 Andrew Hansen as Dex
 John Garvin as Jim Sergeant

Production
Sanctum was inspired by the film's co-writer Andrew Wight's experience with a 1988 cave diving expedition in Australia that resulted in 13 cavers becoming trapped in one of the world's largest underwater cave systems in Nullarbor Plain after a freak storm collapsed the entrance. That incident was documented in the film Nullarbor Dreaming. James Cameron served as executive producer for Sanctum. Even though the film's plot takes place in Esa'ala Cave Papua New Guinea, most of the film was shot in Australia (Gold Coast, Queensland). Sanctum employs 3D photography techniques Cameron developed to film Avatar. All of the underwater sequences took place in a large water tank at the Village Roadshow Studios in Queensland. Real caves were also filmed in South Australia's cave-diving region around Mount Gambier. Stunt diver Agnes Milowka, who appears as a double in the already-released film, drowned in one of these caves on 27 February 2011 when she reportedly ran out of air. In striking similarities to the movie script, she also left her spare tank behind, to force the way through the tight restriction, and it is actually her playing Judes' drowning scene. Universal Studios and Relativity Media paid $12 million for rights to distribute the film in the United States and Canada, and in several foreign countries.

Soundtrack
"Rabaul Taun" – performed by Junior Kokoratts
"Maipope" – performed by Tusiti Roots
"Ride of the Valkyries" – performed by Ioan Gruffudd

Reception

Box office
Sanctum opened with $9.2 million in its first weekend, coming in second behind The Roommate.
As of March 2011, Sanctum was the tenth-highest-grossing Australian film at the international box office. The film also made $3.8 million at the Australian box office.

Critical response
Rotten Tomatoes reports that 30% of 171 critics gave the film a positive review, with an average rating of 4.6/10. The site's critics consensus reads: "Sanctum is beautifully photographed, and it makes better use of 3-D technology than most, but that doesn't make up for its ham-handed script and lifeless cast." Metacritic assigned the film a weighted average score of 42 out of 100 based on 33 critics, indicating "mixed or average reviews". Audiences polled by CinemaScore gave the film an average grade of C+ on an A+ to F scale.

The Age Jim Schembri gave it 3½ stars out of 5 and said "the drama might be shallow but the visuals are great". The UK's Daily Express gave it 3 out of 5, writing: "The action doesn't quite conjure up the claustrophobic intensity you expect but the father-son-storyline is sufficiently muscular".

Awards
Australian Cinematographers Society 2011

Australian Film Institute 2012

Home video
Universal Studios Home Entertainment released Sanctum on DVD, Blu-ray Disc, and Blu-ray 3D on 7 June 2011.

See also
 Survival film, about the film genre, with a list of related films

References

External links
 
 
 
 
 

2011 films
2011 3D films
2010s action adventure films
2011 action thriller films
2010s disaster films
2010s survival films
American disaster films
American action adventure films
American action thriller films
Australian action adventure films
Australian action thriller films
Australian disaster films
Caving mass media
Films about father–son relationships
Films scored by David Hirschfelder
Films about death
Films set in Papua New Guinea
IMAX films
Universal Pictures films
Relativity Media films
FilmNation Entertainment films
American survival films
Underwater action films
Films shot at Village Roadshow Studios
2010s English-language films
2010s American films